Charles Leslie Hale, Baron Hale (13 July 1902 – 9 May 1985) was a British Liberal Party then Labour Party politician.

Background
Hale was the son of Benjamin George Hale, a managing director. He went to the Ashby Grammar School and trained to be a solicitor in Leicester. Thereafter Hale practised first in his hometown Coalville, later in Nuneaton and finally in London.

Career
Hale joined Leicestershire County Council in 1925, aged twenty-three. Four years later he contested Nottingham South unsuccessfully for the Liberal Party. Hale entered the British House of Commons as a Labour member in 1945, having been elected as one of the MPs in of the two-member constituency of Oldham. He represented this constituency until 1950, when it was abolished and split into two divisions. Hale was subsequently returned to Parliament for Oldham West, a seat he held for eighteen years until 1968, when he resigned for health reasons. On 24 April 1972, he was created a life peer with the title Baron Hale of Oldham.

Hale acted as the solicitor for the Spiritualists National Union, and spoke in Parliament for the repeal of the Witchcraft Act 1735 in favour of the Fraudulent Mediums Act.

Family
In 1926 Hale married Dorothy Ann Latham; the couple had a son as well a daughter. He died in 1985.

Works
Thirty Who Were Tried; (1955)
John Philpot Curran; (1958)
Blood on the Scales; (1960)
Hanged in Error; (1961)
Hanging in the Balance; (1962)

Notes

References

External links

1902 births
1985 deaths
Politicians from Leicester
Labour Party (UK) MPs for English constituencies
Labour Party (UK) life peers
Politics of the Metropolitan Borough of Oldham
UK MPs 1945–1950
UK MPs 1950–1951
UK MPs 1951–1955
UK MPs 1955–1959
UK MPs 1959–1964
UK MPs 1964–1966
UK MPs 1966–1970
UK MPs who were granted peerages
Liberal Party (UK) parliamentary candidates
20th-century English politicians
Life peers created by Elizabeth II